In mathematics, a Stanley sequence is an integer sequence generated by a greedy algorithm that chooses the sequence members to avoid arithmetic progressions.
These sequences are named after Richard P. Stanley.

Binary–ternary sequence
The Stanley sequence starting from the empty set consists of those numbers whose ternary representations have only the digits 0 and 1. That is, when written in ternary, they look like binary numbers. These numbers are
0, 1, 3, 4, 9, 10, 12, 13, 27, 28, 30, 31, 36, 37, 39, 40, ... 

By their construction as a Stanley sequence, this sequence is the lexicographically first arithmetic-progression-free sequence. Its elements are the sums of distinct powers of three, the numbers  such that the th central binomial coefficient is 1 mod 3, and the numbers whose balanced ternary representation is the same as their ternary representation.

The construction of this sequence from the ternary numbers is analogous to the construction of the Moser–de Bruijn sequence, the sequence of numbers whose base-4 representations have only the digits 0 and 1, and the construction of the Cantor set as the subset of real numbers in the interval  whose ternary representations use only the digits 0 and 2. More generally, they are a 2-regular sequence, one of a class of integer sequences defined by a linear recurrence relation with multiplier 2.

This sequence includes three powers of two: 1, 4, and 256 = 35 + 32 + 3 + 1. Paul Erdős conjectured that these are the only powers of two that it contains.

Growth rate
For other starting sets  the Stanley sequences that they considered appeared to grow more erratically but even more sparsely.
0, 4, 5, 7, 11, 12, 16, 23, 26, 31, 33, 37, 38, 44, 49, 56, 73, 78, 80, 85, 95, 99,  ... 
That is, there is a dichotomy in the growth rate of Stanley sequences between the ones with similar growth to the binary–ternary sequence and others with a much smaller growth rate; according to this conjecture, there should be no Stanley sequences with intermediate growth.

Moy proved that Stanley sequences cannot grow significantly more slowly than the conjectured bound for the sequences of slow growth. More precisely Moy showed that, for every such sequence, every , and all sufficiently large , the number of elements is at least . 
Later authors improved the constant factor in this bound,
and proved that for Stanley sequences that grow as  the constant factor in their growth rates can be any rational number whose denominator is a power of three.

History
A variation of the binary–ternary sequence (with one added to each element)
was considered in 1936 by Paul Erdős and Pál Turán, who observed that it has no three-term arithmetic progression and conjectured (incorrectly) that it was the densest possible sequence with no arithmetic progression.

In unpublished work with Andrew Odlyzko in 1978, Richard P. Stanley experimented with the greedy algorithm to generate progression-free sequences.
The sequences they studied were exactly the Stanley sequences for the initial sets .

References

Further reading

Integer sequences